Eppenberg is an Ortsgemeinde – a municipality belonging to a Verbandsgemeinde, a kind of collective municipality – in the Cochem-Zell district in Rhineland-Palatinate, Germany. It belongs to the Verbandsgemeinde of Kaisersesch, whose seat is in the like-named town.

Geography 

The municipality lies in the Eifel.

History 
Beginning in 1794, Eppenberg lay under French rule. In 1815 it was assigned to the Kingdom of Prussia at the Congress of Vienna. Since 1946, it has been part of the then newly founded state of Rhineland-Palatinate.

Politics

Municipal council 
The council is made up of 6 council members, who were elected by majority vote at the municipal election held on 7 June 2009, and the honorary mayor as chairman.

Mayor 
Eppenberg's mayor is Nikolaus Braunschädel.

Culture and sightseeing

Buildings 
The following are listed buildings or sites in Rhineland-Palatinate’s Directory of Cultural Monuments:
 Near the graveyard – Wayside chapel, plastered building, 19th century; Gothic Revival gypsum Pietà, 20th century

Youth 
Since the summer of 2005, Eppenberg has had a youth centre for all the village's youth, who organize the yearly Walpurgis Night festivities and village festival.

Kermis 
The St.-Anna-Kirmes is held each year on the last weekend in July.

References

External links 

 Municipality’s official webpage 
 Brief portrait of Eppenberg with film at SWR Fernsehen 

Cochem-Zell